Ust-Sakhray is a rural locality (a settlement) in Dakhovskoye Rural Settlement of Maykopsky District, the Republic of Adygea, Russia. The population was 297 as of 2018. There are 6 streets.

Geography 
The settlement is located near the confluence of the rivers Dakh and Sahrai, 43 km south of Tulsky (the district's administrative centre) by road. Dakhovskaya is the nearest rural locality.

References 

Rural localities in Maykopsky District